Tauentzien may refer to:
Friedrich Bogislav von Tauentzien (1710-1791), Prussian general of the Seven Years' War
Bogislav Friedrich Emanuel Graf Tauentzien von Wittenberg (1760-1824), Prussian general of the Napoleonic Wars and namesake of Tauentzienstraße in Berlin
 Tawęcino (German Tauentzien), a village in the Lębork County, Pomeranian Voivodeship, Poland